This is a list of converts to Judaism from pagan religions.

 Abraham (the founder), probably from Semitic paganism
 Aquila of Sinope (Acylas), from traditional Greek religion
 Bithiah, from traditional Egyptian religion
 Bulan, king of the Khazars, from traditional Khazar religion 
 Jethro, priest of Midian and father-in-law of Moses, from a Mideastern religion
 Makeda, queen of Sheba, from a Mideastern or Ethiopian religion
 Dhu Nuwas, king of Yemen, from a Mideastern religion 
 Obadiah the prophet, from a Mideastern religion
 Sh'maya, Sage and President of the Sanhedrin, apparently from a Mideastern religion
 Avtalyon, Sage and Vice-President of the Sanhedrin, apparently from a Mideastern religion
 Onkelos, Hebrew scholar and translator, from ancient Roman religion
 Ruth, great-grandmother of King David, from a Near Eastern religion.
 Helena, queen of Adiabene, from traditional Greek religion. 
 Izates bar Monobaz, king of Adiabene, from a Persian or Mideastern religion. 
 Symacho, wife of Izates bar Monobaz, from a Persian or Mideastern religion. 
 Monobaz II, king of Adiabene, from a Persian or Mideastern religion. 
 Osenath, from Canaanite religion (her name relates to Anat)
 Zipporah, from a Mideastern or northern African religion
 Yael, from Canaanite or another Near Eastern religion
 Flavia Domitilla, from traditional ancient Roman religion (possibly to Jewish Christianity, as she is also a Christian saint)
 Titus Flavius Clemens (consul), great-nephew of the Roman Emperor Vespasian, from traditional Roman religion (possibly to Jewish Christianity, as he is also a Christian saint)
 Fulvia (wife of Saturninus), wife of Emperor Tiberius' close friend, Saturninus, from traditional Roman religion.
 Tub'a Abu Kariba As'ad, from Arabian religion, was the Himyarite king of Yemen. He ruled Yemen from 390–420 CE.
 Paulina Beturia, from traditional Roman religion

References

 
Former pagans